Muhammad I al-Mustansir was the second ruler of the Hafsid dynasty in Ifriqiya and the first to claim the title of Khalif. Al-Mustansir concluded a peace agreement to end the Eighth Crusade launched by Louis IX of France in 1270. Muhammad I al-Mustansir had been a vassal of the Kingdom of Sicily, but had shaken off his allegiance when King Manfred was overthrown by King Charles I.

On Hunting
In 1247, he wrote a book called "On Hunting", which detailed the ways in which hunting in North Africa was undertaken at the time. An especially interesting chapter is on hunting with salukis, which teaches the hunter on how to manage this animal and how to hunt with it. Other aspects of the book involve the training and management of falcons, and other techniques utilized around his estate in Bizerte.

Eighth Crusade
The Mamluk sultan Baibars had been attacking the remnant of the Crusader states in Syria. Baibars had seized the opportunity after a war pitting the cities of Venice and Genoa against each other (1256–1260) had exhausted the Syrian ports that the two cities controlled. By 1265 Baibars had captured Nazareth, Haifa, Toron, and Arsuf. Hugh III of Cyprus, nominal king of Jerusalem, landed in Acre to defend that city, while Baibars marched as far north as Armenia, which was at that time under Mongol control. 

These events led to Louis' call for a new crusade in 1267. Louis was soon convinced by his brother Charles I, King of Naples and Sicily, to attack Tunis first, which would give them a strong base for attacking Egypt, the focus of Louis' previous crusade as well as the Fifth Crusade before him, both of which had been defeated there. Muhammad I al-Mustansir was rumored to be sympathetic to Christianity by way of his connections with Christian Spain and was considered a good candidate for conversion. Accordingly, Charles suggested to his brother that the arrival of a crusade in his support might bring about al-Mustansir's conversion. Thus it was that Louis directed the Eighth Crusade against Tunis.

In 1270 Louis landed on the African coast in July. Much of the army became sick due to poor drinking water, and Louis himself died from a "flux in the stomach", one day after the arrival of Charles. His dying word was "Jerusalem." Charles proclaimed Louis' son Philip III the new king, but due to his youth Charles became the actual leader of the crusade. 

Due to further diseases the siege of Tunis was abandoned on October 30 by an agreement with the al-Mustansir. In this agreement the Christians gained free trade with Tunis, and residence for monks and priests in the city was guaranteed, so the crusade could be regarded as a partial success. After hearing of the death of Louis and the evacuation of the crusaders from Tunis, Sultan Baibars of Egypt cancelled his plan to send Egyptian troops to fight Louis in Tunis.

Diplomatic relations
According to Ibn Khaldun the Hafsids maintained friendly relations with the Kanem–Bornu Empire and in 1257 the ruler of Kanem sent Al-Mustansir a giraffe as a diplomatic present.

See also
Ibn al-Abbar
Elisenda de Sant Climent

Notes

1228 births
1277 deaths
13th-century Hafsid caliphs
Muslims of the Eighth Crusade